Robert Smyly Greer Hamilton (b Castle Caulfield – d Armagh 1928) was Dean of Armagh from 1924 until his death.

Hamilton was educated at Trinity College, Dublin;and ordained in 1885. He began his career with curacies at Urney and Six Mile Cross. He was the Incumbent of Derryloran from 1896 to 1905; and of Dundalk from 1905 to
1924.

There is a memorial to him in the north aisle at his cathedral.

References

1853 births
1928 deaths
Alumni of Trinity College, Cambridge
Deans of Armagh
19th-century Irish Anglican priests
20th-century Irish Anglican priests